George Broadbent may refer to:

George Robert Broadbent (1863–1947), Australian cyclist and map publisher
George Broadbent (footballer) (born 2000), English footballer
Sir George Walter Broadbent, 4th Baronet (1935–1992), of the Broadbent baronets